Vače is a settlement in the Municipality of Litija in central Slovenia. The area is part of the traditional region of Upper Carniola and is now included with the rest of the municipality in the Central Sava Statistical Region.

Archaeological finds
The settlement is best known for the Hallstatt-period Vače situla, an archaeological treasure of Slovenia, which was discovered in neighboring Klenik in 1882. It is a bronze vessel with a triple figurative frieze. Another important find was the Vače belt-plate, also discovered in Klenik.

Church

The local parish church is dedicated to Saint Andrew and  belongs to the Roman Catholic Archdiocese of Ljubljana. It was built in 1844 on the site of an earlier building that was destroyed by fire.

Notable people from Vače
 Matthias Qualle (1470–1518), Slovene philosopher

Gallery

References

External links

Vače on Geopedia

Populated places in the Municipality of Litija